The Scout and Guide movement in Burundi is served by two organisations 
 Association des Guides du Burundi, member of the World Association of Girl Guides and Girl Scouts
 Association des Scouts du Burundi, member of the World Organization of the Scout Movement

See also